Protogyrodactylidae is a family of trematodes belonging to the order Dactylogyridea.

Genera:
 Protogyrodactylus Johnston & Tiegs, 1922
 Trivitellina Johnston & Tiegs, 1922

References

Platyhelminthes